SS Atlantic Empress was a Greek oil tanker that in 1979 collided with the oil tanker Aegean Captain in the Caribbean, and eventually sank, having created the fifth largest oil spill on record and the largest ship-based spill having spilled 287,000 metric tonnes of crude oil into the Caribbean Sea. It was built at the Odense Staalskibsværft shipyard in Odense, Denmark, and launched on 16 February 1974.

Ship history
The Atlantic Empress was a large crude oil carrier built at the Odense Staalskibsværft shipyard in Odense, Denmark, and launched on 16 February 1974. At the time of her sinking, she was owned by the South Gulf Shipping Company of Greece, and flagged in Liberia.

Collision and sinking 
At the time of the collision Atlantic Empress was sailing from Saudi Arabia to Beaumont, Texas, with a cargo of light crude oil owned by Mobil Oil. Aegean Captain was en route to Singapore from Aruba.

Aegean Captain changed course, but it was too late; at 7:15 p.m, the two ships collided, with the Empress tearing a hole in the Captains starboard bow. Large fires began on each ship, which were soon beyond the control of the crews, who abandoned their ships.

The collision and fire claimed the lives of 26 of the Empress'''s crew members, and one crew member on the Captain. The remaining crew from both ships were taken to Tobago for medical treatment, while the Empresss captain was transported to a hospital in Texas, having inhaled fire.

Firefighters from the Trinidad and Tobago Coast Guard brought the fires aboard the Captain under control the next day, and members of her crew returned to the ship, and were able to bring her into Curaçao, where her cargo was off-loaded. Meanwhile, a five-man specialist emergency crew from the Dutch Salvage organization Smit International and the German Bugsier, managed by a Salvage inspector of Smit International, attempted to control the fire aboard Empress, and contain the spreading oil slick. Two tugs (one of them being the Smit Zwarte Zee) towed the burning ship further out to sea.

On 24 July, a week after the collision, the Empress was still burning, and also listing, when an explosion occurred that increased the rate of flow. Finally, on 3 August, the Empress sank, having spilled 287,000 metric tonnes of crude oil into the Caribbean Sea.

By comparison, in the Exxon Valdez'' spill ten years later 37,000 metric tonnes of oil was released.

See also
List of oil spills

References

External links
 
 
 

1974 ships
Ships built in Odense
Maritime incidents in 1979
Oil tankers
ExxonMobil oil spills
Ships of ExxonMobil
Oil spills in North America